The Daniel McConn Barn is a historic agricultural building located in near Fort Madison, Iowa, United States. It was listed on the National Register of Historic Places in 2000. It is a bank barn that is built into a south-facing slope. The south exposure of the basement level of the structure allowed protection of livestock in cold weather. The Pennsylvania-type barn was built around 1857 on a farm owned by Daniel McConn, a native of County Down, Ireland. He made his way to Fort Madison in 1837 where he became a merchant. While he owned the farm, it was worked by a tenant farmer. The foundation of the structure is of rubble construction and the sides of the upper structure are of vertical board-and-batten siding. It is capped with a low-pitched, gable roof that features three pyramid-shaped hip roofed ventilation cupolas located along the ridge.

References

Barns on the National Register of Historic Places in Iowa
National Register of Historic Places in Lee County, Iowa